Tuzla Island (from Turkish "tuzla" – salty, saline, literally: saltpan) is a sandy islet in the form of a spit located in the middle of the Strait of Kerch between the Kerch Peninsula in the west and the Taman Peninsula in the east. The Strait of Kerch connects the Sea of Azov and the Black Sea. Administratively, Tuzla Island is part of the Kerch municipality of eastern Crimea.

Infrastructure
Officially the island does not have a permanent settlement; however, it had a border station (the Border Service of Ukraine), a small fishing settlement with a few private garden lots, and two vacation resorts, "Albatross" and "Two Seas". The island's electricity is supplied by two diesel power stations. The island also has a pier and a helicopter pad. A second pier located near the fishing settlement is in critical condition and is not in use. Two concrete surface roads run along the island. From May through October, a store operates at the "Two Seas" resort.

The island was used during the construction of the Crimean Bridge, which opened in May 2018, connecting Crimea to mainland Russia.

History
Tuzla Island was formed when the spit that continued the Taman peninsula suffered from massive erosion during a major storm in 1925. In ancient times (2,500 years ago) the sea level was four meters below the present, which meant that at the site of modern Tuzla was quite an extensive area of land, which was part of the Taman Peninsula. Taman Peninsula itself at that time was part of the Kuban delta, and was separated from the rest of the land by river channels, which drained into the Sea of Azov and the Black Sea. Some historians identify Tuzla as the island of Alopeka, mentioned by ancient authors, located in the waters of Cimmerian Bosporus, and when the island periodically joined to the Asian shore of the Bosporus, the resulting braid was used as the entrance to the passage through the narrowest part of the Cimmerian Bosporus, which is located between Alopekoy and the European shore of the Bosporus. Other historians and geologists reject such a hypothesis, believing that neither the island nor the Tuzla Spit existed in ancient times.

Before the Soviet Union entered World War II in 1941, it was part of the Crimean Oblast. This in turn on February 19, 1954, became a part of the Ukrainian SSR, which after the dissolution of the Soviet Union in 1991 became the state of Ukraine.

2003 dispute

There was a territorial dispute over the ownership of the island between Ukraine and Russia in October 2003. The Russian authorities claimed the 1954 transfer of Crimea to Ukraine had only included the continental parts of Crimea, even though the Tuzla Island had been administratively part of Crimea since 1941.

The Russian side started to build a dam from the Taman Peninsula towards the island to revive the eroded peninsula without any preliminary consultations with the Ukrainian government authorities. After construction of the 3.8 km dam was suspended exactly at the Russian-Ukrainian border, the distance between the dam and the island had become . The dam increased the intensity of the stream in the strait and the deterioration of the island. To prevent the deterioration the government of Ukraine funded ground work to deepen the bed of the strait. Ukraine refused to recognize the strait as inner waters of both countries until 2003.

On October 21, 2003, the Border Service of Ukraine arrested the Russian tugboat Truzhenik, which had crossed the State Border of Ukraine and conducted photo and video surveillance of the island. After the incident, a respective protocol was created and the ship was handed over to the Russian border authorities. On October 23, 2003, the Ukrainian parliament issued a resolution "to eliminate a threat to the territorial integrity of Ukraine that appeared as a result of dam construction by the Russian Federation in the strait of Kerch". A provisional special parliamentary commission was created to investigate the case more thoroughly.

On October 30–31, 2003, talks started between Ukraine and Russia that led to suspension of the construction of the dam. Due to the conflict, on December 2, 2003, a border patrol station of Ukraine was installed on the island. On December 5, 2003, the Cabinet of Ukraine issued Order #735p in regards to urgent measures to save the island. On July 4, 2004, the Cabinet of Ukraine issued Order #429p, which foresaw the construction of shore reinforcement structures and population transfer from the flooding territories.

Following the 2003 conflict, the Supreme Council of Crimea ordered the establishment of a new settlement on the island. However, on September 6, 2006, the Kerch city administration refused to create such a settlement, as it conflicted with the administrative-territorial composition of the city.

Disputes about right of passage were resolved by a 2003 bilateral agreement on cooperation in the use of the sea of Azov and the strait of Kerch, which made these water bodies shared internal waters of both countries, but new tensions arose after the 2014 Russian annexation of Crimea and Sevastopol.

Since 2014 Crimean crisis

Since Russian annexed Crimea in March 2014, the island has been transferred into the possession of Russia's central government by the newly established Crimean authorities and was used as a stepping stone for a new bridge linking Crimea to mainland Russia.

Gallery

See also
 List of islands of Ukraine

References

External links

 «Остров Тузла» — Севастополь «ОК», № 1-2, 2000 г.
 Russia-Ukraine Will Resume Talks on Maritime Delimitation in the Black Sea and the Sea of Azov/Kerch Strait in June 2009 of 22 January 2009 and Ukraine May Refer Maritime Border Row with Russia to UN Court of 4 February 2009
  
 Ostriychuk, O. Historical-legal aspect of Tuzla island affiliation. 
 Conflict chronicle
 Conflict around Tuzla island: 10 years later. Podrobnosti. 29 September 2013

Landforms of Crimea
Islands of Ukraine
Russia–Ukraine border
Territorial disputes of Ukraine
Disputed islands of the Black Sea
Kerch

Islands of Russia
Kerch Strait